Union Hospital was located in The Bronx.

History
It opened in 1922 and, after it closed, the building was repurposed as a community health center. In 1983, Union was taken over by St Barnabas, a nearby hospital, and "turned into an ambulatory care clinic."

References

  

Defunct hospitals in the Bronx
History of the Bronx